Hathras is a historical city in Uttar Pradesh, India. It is also the headquarters of Hathras district, formed on 3 May 1997 by merging parts of Aligarh, Mathura and Agra. It is a part of the Aligarh Division.

The primary spoken language is a dialect of Hindi, Braj Bhasha, which is closely related to Khariboli, one of, several dialects spoken in the Delhi region. It is known for production of asafoetida (aka hing).

Administration 
Hathras is a district headquarter with four subdivisions - Hathras, sasni, Sikandra Rao, and Sadabad. It is a Lok Sabha constituency under the reserved category of Schedule Caste. The district has three assembly constituencies, following three subdivisions. The Hathras district, formerly known as Mahamaya Nagar, was created in 1997 with the incorporation of parts of the Aligarh, Mathura, and Agra districts.

Local bodies 
Hathras has nine local bodies:

Hathras
Sikandra Rao
Sasni
Sadabad
Mursan
Hasayan
Sahpau
Mendu 
Purdil Nagar

Geography
It has an average elevation of 185 metres (606 feet) and is situated on the Agra, Aligarh and Mathura, and Bareilly highway crossings. It is known for its extreme temperature variations. As of the 2001 Indian census, Hathras had a population of 123,243. with a gender distribution is 53% male and 47% female. Hathras has an average literacy rate of 60%, higher than the national average of 59.5%, of which 66% being male and 53% being female. 14% of the population is under six years of age.

Climate 
Hathras has a monsoon-influenced humid subtropical climate, typical of north-central India. Summers start in April ending around May. The monsoon season starts in late June, continuing till early October, bringing high humidity.

Transport
Four railway stations serve Hathras: Hathras Junction railway station, Hathras Road railway station, Hathras City railway station, and Hathras Kila railway station.
A new station on the dedicated Freight Corridor Line was named New Hathras.

Hathras is the only city in the area to have five railway stations named after it.

History 
Hathras became a district on 6 May 1997 with the merging of some Tehsils of Aligarh and Mathura. Hathras falls under the Braj region of Northern India and is famous for its industrial, literary, and cultural activities as a part of Aligarh. It has been an industrial centre since the British Raj era.

In 2020, a 19-year-old Dalit woman was gang-raped in the Hathras district, by four upper caste men. She died two weeks later in a Delhi hospital.

Notable people 
 
 
 Kaka Hathrasi (Poet)
 Raja Mahendra Pratap (King of Mursan Riyasat) 
 Thakur Malkhan Singh (Freedom Fighter)

References

External links

 Hathras district profile
 Tourist Places at Hathras

Cities and towns in Hathras district
Hathras